Kalkijug  ( kol-kee-joog, meaning Age of Kalki) (2016) is an Indian Bengali thriller film directed by Debarati Gupta, and produced by Macneill Engineering Ltd. It features Bratya Basu and Debshankar Halder in lead roles. The film is scheduled for release in the end of July 2015.
The film depicts a clash of ego between two brilliant minds that pans out dramatically when an old unsolved murder mystery resurfaces out of the blue.

Cast
Bratya Basu as ACP Dilip Dutta
Debshankar Halder as Sankarshan Gupta
Rimjhim Mitra as Viji/Sub Inspector Vijaylakshmi
Locket Chatterjee as Sukanya Ray
Sourav Chakraborty as Arpan/Sub Inspector Arpan Sarkar
Paulami Basu as Enakshi Dutta

Soundtrack
The music of Kalkijug is composed by Raja Narayan Deb. The music features a western style of music fused with Indian percussions.

External links
  Official Facebook Page

Bengali-language Indian films
2010s Bengali-language films
2016 films
Indian detective films
2016 thriller films